The following is a list of music awards and/or nominations earned by the British singer-songwriter Lisa Stansfield, along with her music recording sales certifications and entries in the year-end charts.

Music awards and nominations

ASCAP awards
The American Society of Composers, Authors and Publishers (ASCAP) is a not-for-profit performance rights organization that protects its members' musical copyrights by monitoring public performances of their music, whether via a broadcast or live performance, and compensating them accordingly. Stansfield won one award:

Billboard Music Awards
The Billboard Music Awards are sponsored by Billboard magazine to honor artists based on Billboard Year-End Charts. The award ceremony was held from 1990 to 2007, until its reintroduction in 2011. Before and after that time span, winners have been announced by Billboard, both in the press and as part of their year-end issue.

|-
| 1997
| Herself
| Top Hot Dance Club Play Artist
|

Billboard Music Video awards
The Billboard Music Awards are sponsored by Billboard magazine. The awards are based on sales data by Nielsen SoundScan and radio information by Nielsen Broadcast Data Systems. Stansfield holds one award:

Brit awards
Brit Awards are the British Phonographic Industry's annual pop music awards. The awards began in 1977 and as annual event in 1982 under the auspices of the British record industry's trade association. From 2007, the BRITs reverted to a live broadcast on British television, on 14 February on ITV. Stansfield received three awards out of twelve nominations in total.

Notes

Classic Pop Reader Awards
Classic Pop is a monthly British music magazine, which launched in October 2012. It was devised and founded by Ian Peel, who was also editor for the first 19 issues.  Rik Flynn stepped in as editor until Issue 23 followed by current editor Steve Harnell.  Ian Peel remains involved as Founder & Editor-at-Large.

|-
| rowspan=2|2019
| Herself
| Artist of the Year
| 
|-
| "Billionaire"
| Single of the Year 
|

DMC awards

Grammy awards
The Grammy Awards are awarded annually by the National Academy of Recording Arts and Sciences (NARAS) in the United States. Stansfield was nominated twice in 1991.

Notes
I  Won by Mariah Carey.
J  Won also by Carey for her performance of "Vision of Love".

Ivor Novello awards
The Ivor Novello Awards as the major platform for recognising and rewarding Britain's songwriting and composing are awards presented annually in London by the British Academy of Songwriters, Composers and Authors (BASCA). They were first introduced in 1955.

Razzie awards
The Golden Raspberry Awards, abbreviated as the Razzies,  is an anti-award presented in recognition of the worst in movies, on the contrary. The term raspberry in the name is used in its irreverent sense, as in "blowing a raspberry". The annual show, founded in 1981 by publicist John J.B. Wilson, precedes the corresponding Academy Awards ceremony by one day. Stansfield shares her nomination as a co-writer (along with John Barry, Ian Devaney and Andy Morris) for a song written for Indecent Proposal film.

Notes
K  Won "Addams Family Whoomp!" by Tag Team from Addams Family Values.

Silver Clef awards
The Silver Clef Awards is an annual music award event originally based in the UK, which is to support all the charity and awarding activities of the Nordoff-Robbins Centre for Music Therapy (that expanded also to U.S. in 1988).

Women's World awards
Since 2004, the Women's World Award are sponsored by the World Awards organization headed by former USSR President Mikhail Gorbachev, intended for women who have influenced the world by their work in areas such as society or politics. In 2005, the awards were given in Leipzig, Germany.

World Music awards
The World Music Awards is an international awards show founded in 1989 that annually honors recording artists based on worldwide sales figures provided by the International Federation of the Phonographic Industry (IFPI).

Variety Club of Great Britain Awards

Music recording sales certifications
Music recording sales certification is a system of certifying that a music recording has shipped or sold a certain number of copies. The number of sales or shipments required for a silver, gold, (multi-)platinum or diamond threshold depends on the population of the territory in which the title is released. These certificates are not automatic; the record label must pay a fee to have carried out an audit into the release in question.

BPI
The British Phonographic Industry (BPI) is the UK record industry's trade association. The level of the award varies and certificates are usually awarded on the basis of the amount of units the release has shipped, rather than the amount it has sold. Stansfield received  eight certifications.

BVMI
In Germany Bundesverband Musikindustrie (BVMI) represents the music industry. BVMI launched its Gold and Platinum award program in 1975, relying on an independent auditor for the accuracy of the sales required for the awards. Stansfield won three certifications.

IFPI
In Europe, International Federation of the Phonographic Industry (IFPI) is the organization that represents the interests of the recording industry worldwide. It is headquartered in London, with regional offices in Brussels, Hong Kong, Miami and Moscow.

RIAA
The Recording Industry Association of America (RIAA) operates an award program for the releases that sell a large(r) number of copies. Peniston received three certifications.

Year-end charts
Year-end charts are usually calculated by an inverse-point system based solely on a title's performance during any given chart year.

Austria
The official singles chart in Austria is Ö3 Austria Top 40, aired on Fridays on Hitradio Ö3. The weekly number-ones are released by Musikmarkt and go TV.

Italy
The Federation of the Italian Music Industry (FIMI) is an umbrella organization that keeps track of virtually all aspects of the music recording industry in Italian. Starting 2008, the physical singles chart was replaced by a digital downloads chart based on legal Internet and mobile downloads.

The Netherlands
Dutch Top 40 is one of the three official singles charts in the Netherlands. Apart from Single Top 100, the Top 40 and Mega Top 50 include airplay data (i.e. the more often a song is played on the radio, the higher it is placed also in the chart).

Switzerland
In Switzerland, Singles Top 75, respectively Alben Top 75 is effective, and the charts published by Media Control GfK International are a record of the highest-selling singles and albums in various genres in the country.

UK
UK Top 75 is compiled by The Official Charts Company (OCC) and published in Music Week magazine. The full list of Top 200 selling singles/albums in the United Kingdom is published exclusively in ChartsPlus. Unlike the U.S. charts, no airplay statistics are used for the UK list.

U.S.
The U.S. Billboard Year-End charts are a cumulative measure of a single or album's performance in the United States, based upon the Billboard magazine charts during any given chart year.

See also
 Lisa Stansfield discography
 List of artists who reached number one on the US Dance chart

References

General

Specific

External links
Lisa-Stansfield.com

Lisa Stansfield
Stansfield, Lisa